Dahr Abi Yaghi (Arabic: ضهر أبي ياغي) is a village in Batroun District, North Governorate, Lebanon. It is geographically located on the southern border of the North Governorate near the village of Masrah. There were 138 voters in the town during the 2009 legislative elections, 148 voters in 2014 and 151 voters in 2017.

References

Batroun District
Populated places in the North Governorate
Maronite Christian communities in Lebanon